:
 University of Algiers
 :
 University of Queensland
 James Cook University
 La Trobe University
 University of Sydney
 University of Newcastle, Australia
 Charles Sturt University
 Macquarie University
 Flinders University
 Curtin University of Technology
 :
University of Dhaka 
 Bangladesh Health Professions Institute (BHPI)
:
 College of Medical Sciences of Santa Casa de São Paulo
 Pontifical Catholic University of São Paulo
 University of São Paulo
 Federal University of São Paulo
 State University of São Paulo
 :
 University of Alberta
 University of British Columbia
 Dalhousie University
 Université Laval
 McGill University
 Université de Montréal
 University of Ottawa
 University of Toronto
 University of Western Ontario
 :
 University of Hong Kong
 :
 All India Institute of Speech and Hearing
 National Institute of Speech and Hearing
 Ali Yavar Jung National Institute for the Hearing Handicapped- There are four regional centres
 :
 University of Haifa
 Tel Aviv University
 Hadassah Academic College
 :
 Universiti Kebangsaan Malaysia
 Universiti Sains Malaysia, Kelantan
 :
 University of the Philippines Manila
 University of Santo Tomas
 De La Salle Medical and Health Sciences Institute
 Cebu Doctors' University
 :
 Ewha Womans University
 :
 Anadolu University
 Ankara Yıldırım Beyazıt University
 Biruni University
 Cappadocia University
 Hacettepe University
 Istanbul Medipol University
 Istinye University
 İzmir Bakırçay University
 Ondokuz Mayıs University
 University of Health Sciences (Turkey)
 Üsküdar University
 Istanbul Gelisim University
 :
 Makerere University
 :
 Birmingham City University
 City University London
 de Montfort University
 University College London
 University of East Anglia
 University of Reading
 University of Sheffield
 University of Strathclyde
 University of Manchester
 University of Newcastle upon Tyne
 University of Ulster
 University of Wales Institute, Cardiff
 Leeds Metropolitan University
 Manchester Metropolitan University
 Queen Margaret University
 :
 Abilene Christian University
 Adelphi University
 Alabama A&M University
 Appalachian State University
 Arizona State University
 Arkansas State University
 Armstrong State University
 Auburn University
 Ball State University
 Baylor University
 Bloomsburg University of Pennsylvania
 Boston University
 Bowling Green State University
 Brigham Young University
 Brooklyn College
 Buffalo State College
 California State University, Chico
 California State University, East Bay
 California State University, Fresno
 California State University, Fullerton
 California State University, Long Beach
 California State University, Los Angeles
 California State University, Northridge
 California State University, Sacramento
 California State University, San Marcos
 California University of Pennsylvania
 Calvin College
 Case Western Reserve University
 Central Michigan University
 Chapman University
 Clarion University of Pennsylvania
 Cleveland State University
 College of St. Rose
 The College of Wooster
 Duquesne University
 East Carolina University
 East Stroudsburg University
 East Tennessee State University
 Eastern Illinois University
 Eastern Kentucky University
 Eastern Michigan University
 Eastern New Mexico University
 Eastern Washington University
 Edinboro University of Pennsylvania
 Emerson College
 Florida Atlantic University
 Florida International University
 Florida State University
 Fontbonne University
 Fort Hays State University
 Fredonia
 Gallaudet University
 Geneseo
 George Washington University
 Georgia State University
 Governors State University
 Hampton University
 Harding University
 Hofstra University
 Howard University
 Hunter College
 Idaho State University
 Illinois State University
 Indiana State University
 Indiana University-Bloomington
 Indiana University of Pennsylvania
 Ithaca College
 Jackson State University
 James Madison University
 Kansas State University
 Kean University
 Kent State University
 Lamar University
 La Salle University
 Lehman College
 LIU Brooklyn
 LIU Post
 Loma Linda University
 Longwood University
 Louisiana State University
 LSU Health Sciences Center Shreveport
 Louisiana State University Medical Center
 Louisiana Tech University
 Loyola University Maryland
 Marshall University
 Marquette University
 Marywood University
 Massachusetts General Hospital Institute of Health Professionals
 Mercy College
 Miami University
 Michigan State University
 Minnesota State University, Mankato
 Minot State University
 Misericordia University
 Mississippi University for Women
 Missouri State University
 Molloy College
 Montclair State University
 Moorhead State University
 Murray State University
 Nazareth College of Rochester
 New Mexico State University
 New Paltz
 New York Medical College
 New York University
 North Carolina Central University
 Northeastern University
 Northeastern State University
 Northern Arizona University
 Northern Illinois University
 Northwestern University
 Nova Southeastern University
 Old Dominion University
 Ohio State University
 Ohio University
 Oklahoma State University
 Our Lady of the Lake University
 Pennsylvania State University
 Plattsburgh
 Portland State University
 Purdue University
 Queens College
 Radford University
 Rockhurst University
 Rush University
 St. Ambrose University
 St. Cloud State University
 St. John's University
 St. Louis University
 Saint Xavier University
 San Diego State University
 San Francisco State University
 San Jose State University
 Seton Hall University
 South Carolina State University
 Southeastern Louisiana University
 Southeast Missouri State University
 Southern Connecticut State University
 Southern Illinois University–Edwardsville
 Southern Illinois University–Carbondale
 Southern University and A&M College
 Stephen F. Austin State University
 Stockton University
 Syracuse University
 Teachers College, Columbia University
 Temple University
 Tennessee State University
 Texas A&M University at Kingsville
 Texas Christian University
 Texas State University
 Texas Tech University Health Sciences Center
 Texas Woman's University
 Touro College
 Towson University
 Truman State University
 Universidad del Turabo
 University of Akron
 The University of Alabama
 University of Arizona
 University of Arkansas–Fayetteville
 University of Arkansas–Little Rock
 University at Buffalo
 University of Cincinnati
 University of Central Arkansas
 University of Central Florida
 University of Central Missouri
 University of Central Oklahoma
 University of Colorado
 University of Connecticut
 University of the District of Columbia
 University of Georgia
 University of Florida
 University of Hawaiʻi at Mānoa
 University of Houston
 University of Iowa
 University of Illinois at Urbana–Champaign
 University of Kansas
 University of Kentucky
 University of Louisiana at Lafayette
 University of Louisiana–Monroe
 University of Louisville
 University of Maine
 University of Massachusetts–Amherst
 University of Maryland–College Park
 University of Memphis
 University of Minnesota
 University of Minnesota Duluth
 University of Mississippi
 University of Missouri
 University of Montana
 University of Montevallo
 University of Nebraska–Kearney
 University of Nebraska–Lincoln
 University of Nebraska–Omaha
 University of Nevada, Reno
 University of New Hampshire
 University of New Mexico
 University of North Carolina
 University of North Carolina–Greensboro
 University of North Texas
 University of North Dakota
 University of Northern Colorado
 University of Northern Iowa
 University of Oklahoma Health Sciences Center
 University of Oregon
 University of Pittsburgh
 University of Puerto Rico
 University of Redlands
 University of Rhode Island
 University of South Alabama
 University of South Carolina
 University of South Dakota
 University of South Florida
 University of Southern Mississippi
 University of Tennessee–Knoxville
 University of Texas at Austin
 University of Texas at Dallas
 University of Texas at El Paso
 University of Texas-Pan American
 University of Toledo
 University of Tulsa
 University of Utah
 University of the Pacific
 University of Vermont
 University of Virginia
 University of Washington
 University of West Georgia
 University of Wisconsin–Eau Claire
 University of Wisconsin–Madison
 University of Wisconsin–Milwaukee
 University of Wisconsin–River Falls
 University of Wisconsin–Stevens Point
 University of Wisconsin–Whitewater
 University of Wyoming
 Utah State University
 Valdosta State University
 Vanderbilt University
 Washington State University
 Washington State University, Spokane
 Wayne State University
 West Chester University of Pennsylvania
 West Texas A&M University
 West Virginia University
 Western Carolina University
 Western Illinois University
 Western Kentucky University
 Western Michigan University
 Western Washington University
 Wichita State University
 William Paterson University
 Worcester State University

 
Higher education-related lists